German Embassy School or Deutsche Botschaftsschule may refer to:
 German Embassy School Addis Ababa
 Deutsche Botschaftsschule Peking (Beijing)
 German Embassy School Tehran

See also
 German International School (disambiguation)
 German School (disambiguation)